Rampurwa may refer to:
Rampurwa, Mehsi, Bihar
Rampurwa-Mirjapur, Bihar
Rampurwa-Mirzapur, Bihar
Rampur Jetha
Rampurwa, Lumbini, Nepal
Rampurwa, Narayani, Nepal